Frédéric Ngenzebuhoro was Vice-President of Burundi from 11 November 2004 to 26 August 2005. He is an ethnic Tutsi and a member of the Union for National Progress (UPRONA) party.  Prior to that appointment, Ngenzebuhoro had served in a number of ministerial capacities under prior President Pierre Buyoya.

References

Year of birth missing (living people)
Living people
Tutsi people
Union for National Progress politicians
Vice-presidents of Burundi